The first season (2019–2020) of the Turkish TV series,  Kuruluş: Osman, created by Mehmet Bozdağ succeeds the fifth season of the series' predecessor, Diriliş: Ertuğrul, and precedes the second season of the series. Season one of Kuruluş: Osman is also the sixth season of the two Turkish TV series when including the seasons of Diriliş: Ertuğrul. The first season of the historical drama television series premiered on 20 November 2019 and concluded on 24 June 2020.

Plot 
10 or 15 years after the Berke-Hulagu war, Ertuğrul Ghazi goes to Konya and he leaves his brother, Dündar Bey, in charge of his tribe. Dündar Bey is easily swayed by others into doing their misdeeds. He falls into the trap of the devious Selçuk Sançak Bey, Alişar, and the merciless princess of Kulucahisar, Sofia, who seeks to kill all the Turks. Osman, Dündar's nephew, can see through Alişar and Sofia's plans and warns him about them, despite his refusal to listen. As they continue to build more tension against the Kayı, Geyhatu sends Komutan Balgay to cause more trouble and stop the Kayı, especially Osman, from rebelling against the Mongols. Dündar, who bows down to the Mongols becoming the Sançak Bey, can't see Alişar's anger over his position being given over to him and he believes him when Alişar blames Osman for his son's killing. Soon after, along with the threat from Kulucahisar, Dündar is shown the truth, Alişar is beheaded by Osman, and Osman has married his love, Bala. Following this, after many difficulties, Balgay is presumably killed by Osman while Kulucahisar is conquered by the Kayı with Sofia's death happening in the process.

Production
The season was written and produced by Mehmet Bozdağ and directed by Metin Günay. The theme music is by Alpay Göktekin and Zeynep Alasya.

Filming
It was filmed in a plateau set up in Riva, Beykoz. A separate part of the shooting location was reserved for the horses and animals of the series, where they lived in a natural environment and were looked after by their instructors. At the shooting location of the series, huge castles, inns, baths, mosques, churches were meticulously built to the finest detail. At the time when the series was first being filmed, 60 separate teams of carpenters were working on the plateau, the largest in Europe, and 1500 people were working feverishly for the first season. In the series, an 800-meter artificial lake was transformed into a huge river.

Casting 
At first, when the series was named Diriliş: Osman, Aslıhan Karalar, the actress who played Burçin Hatun, was thought to play the role of Malhun Hatun, who didn't even appear in this season. The thought was established due to the fact that Malhun Hatun was Osman I's first wife according to history and that Aslıhan Karalar was the first young actress who was confirmed to join the series. However, in the series, Osman's first partner is Bala Hatun played by the Turkish actress Özge Törer. This was only revealed with the release of the series' first episode.

Music
The theme music is by Alpay Göktekin and Zeynep Alasya. Alpay Göktekin died on 5 May 2020, so therefore, could only compose the music for season one of the series.

Release
The first trailer for the season was released on 14 October 2019. The second trailer was launched on 24 October 2019 and fans were waiting for the new series to finally be aired on 20 November 2019 on ATV (Turkey).

Reception
The season was well received in Turkey. In December 2019, Kuruluş: Osman attracted a record viewership on ATV, in its fourth weekend of broadcast, the 4th episode of the series recorded a countrywide rating of 14.46.

Cast

Main characters 

 Burak Özçivit as Osman Bey
 Özge Törer as Bala Hatun
  as Boran Alp
 Ragıp Savaş as Dündar Bey 
 Eren Vurdem as Konur Alp
  as Prenses Sofia
 Nurettin Sönmez as Bamsı Beyrek
 Burak Çelik as Göktuğ Alp (formerly Kongar)

Supporting characters 

 Didem Balçın as Selcan Hatun
 Eren Hacısalihoğlu as Batur Bey 
  as Zöhre Hatun 
 Buse Arslan as Aygül Hatun 
  as Bahadır Bey
 Seda Yıldız as Şeyh Edebali 
  as Gündüz Bey  
 Yurdaer Okur as Balgay
 Emel Dede as Gonca Hatun
 Çağrı Şensoy as Cerkutay 
 Latif Koru as Sıddık Alp (formerly Prens Salvador)
 Celal Al as Abdurrahman Gazi
  as Efendi Yannis
  as Samsa Çavuş
 Aslıhan Karalar as Burçin Hatun

Minor characters 
 
 Tolga Akkaya as Dumrul Alp
 Ömer Ağan as Saltuk Alp
 Abdül Süsler as Komutan Kalanoz
 Mehmet Sabri Arafatoğlu as Demirci Bey
 Murat Karak as Şahin Bey
  as Ayşe Hatun
 Ayşen Gürler as Helen
  as Nizamettin
  as Ayaz Alp
 Şevket Çapkınoğlu as Megala
 Burak Sarımola as Komutan Andreas
  as Zorba
  as Melek
 Nizamettin Özkaya as Alexis
 Muammer Çagatay Keser as Kılıç Alp
 Kani Katkici as Erkut Alp
 Mete Deran as Çetin Alp
 Ercan Kabadayi as Boğaç Alp
 Kaya Demirkiran as Demirbüken Alp
 Kadir Terzi as Kanturali Alp
 Kadir Polatçi as Yaman Alp
 Fatih Osmanlı as Sancar Alp
 Ahmet Kılıç as Zülfikar Derviş
 Ali Sinan Demir as Dursun Fakıh
  as Akça Derviş

Guest characters 

 Serdar Gökhan as Süleyman Şah
  as Sungurtekin Bey
 Yeşim Ceren Bozoğlu as Hazal Hatun 
 Akbarxo'ja Rasulov as Noyan Subutay
  as Komutan Böke
  as Şifacı Rabi'a Ana
 Sercan Sert as Theokoles 
 Serkan Tatar as Pehlivan Derviş
  as Aybars Bey
 Yaşar Aydınlıoğlu as Tekfur Yorgopolos
 Hazal Adıyaman as Princess Adelfa
 Selin Deveci as Aybüke Hatun
  as the head of the White-Bearded Men.
 Kaan Tutkun as a Mongol commander
 Kuzey Yücehan as Komutan Köni
 Elif Cansu Akbiyik as Princess Adelfa's servant.
 Arslanbek Sultanbekov as the singer at Osman and Bala's wedding.
 Esra Bilgiç as Halime Sultan

Episodes

Notes

References

External links
 Kuruluş: Osman- Season 1 on IMDb

Diriliş: Ertuğrul and Kuruluş: Osman
2019 television seasons